New Media & Society is a peer-reviewed academic journal covering the field of communication. The journal's editor-in-chief is Steve Jones (University of Illinois at Chicago). It has been in publication since 1999 and is published by SAGE Publishing.

Abstracting and indexing
The journal is abstracted and indexed in Scopus and the Social Sciences Citation Index. According to the Journal Citation Reports, its 2020 impact factor is 8.061, ranking it 2nd out of 95 journals in the category "Communication".

References

External links

SAGE Publishing academic journals
English-language journals
8 times per year journals
Communication journals
Publications established in 1999